Edward Buncombe (1742–1778) was a plantation owner from the Province of North Carolina who served as a colonel in the North Carolina militia and Continental Army (the army of the Patriot side) in the American Revolutionary War.  He is the namesake of Buncombe County in western North Carolina. In 1820, his surname (in its status as the name of that county) became the source of the derogatory American slang term, "bunkum" and its shortened form, "bunk" in consequence of the U.S. representative for the county, Felix Walker, invoking the county during a poorly received speech delivered on the floor of the U.S. House of Representatives.

Biography
Buncombe was born in 1742 on the West Indies island of St. Christopher (today St. Kitts). He grew up there and in England. He immigrated to North Carolina in 1768 and settled at a plantation he had inherited near the shore of Albemarle Sound on the Atlantic coast, in what is now Washington County. In 1774, as the independence movement of the Thirteen Colonies gathered steam, he took a leading role in convening proindependence meetings, especially the First Provincial Congress, which is reportedly the first assembly anywhere in the Thirteen Colonies to defy a royal governor. 

Service record:
Tyrrell County Regiment, North Carolina militia (1775-1777)
9/9/1775, a Colonel in the Tyrrell County Regiment of militia.   
4/15/1776 until his death in May 1778, Colonel of the 5th North Carolina Regiment  
10/4/1777, captured at Germantown, POW in Philadelphia, paroled  
May 1778, fell down a flight of stairs, reopened old wounds, died as a result.  

He joined a local militia, the Tyrrell County Regiment of the North Carolina militia. The "Halifax Assembly" elected him colonel of the 5th North Carolina Regiment of the Continental Army on April 15, 1776 (three days after it had passed the historic Halifax Resolves). He was wounded and captured on October 4, 1777 at the Battle of Germantown, fought several miles outside of the rebel capital of Philadelphia, which the British had recently seized. The British army paroled him to that city. The following May 1778, Col. Buncombe fell down some stairs while sleepwalking and his wounds reopened, causing him to bleed to death. He is buried in Christ Church Burial Ground in Philadelphia.

Tax records of 1782 say that his estate included  of land and 10 Negroes.

In 1791, the State of North Carolina created a new county from parts of two other counties and named it for Col. Buncombe. The present Buncombe County is a combination of parts of the original one with parts of neighboring counties.

References

Further reading
Ashe, Samuel. 1905. A Biographical History of North Carolina. Vol. I. p. 198.
Powell, William S., editor. 1979. Dictionary of North Carolina Biography, Volume 1.  Chapel Hill, NC:  University of North Carolina Press.

External links
Photo of the waymark of Buncombe Hall, Col. Buncombe's manor.
Capsule biography of Col. Edward Buncombe
Colonel Edward Buncombe, 1742-1778. 
Roster of the 5th Regiment
Photo of Edward Buncombe's grave site
USHistory.org. Christ Church Burial Ground

1742 births
1778 deaths
North Carolina militiamen in the American Revolution
Continental Army officers from North Carolina
People of colonial North Carolina
People from Saint Kitts
Saint Kitts and Nevis people of British descent
Accidental deaths from falls
Deaths from bleeding
Accidental deaths in Pennsylvania 
Burials at Christ Church, Philadelphia
Buncombe County, North Carolina
United States military personnel killed in the American Revolutionary War